Charles Edward Tisdall (9 April 1866 – 17 March 1936) was the 19th mayor of Vancouver, British Columbia from 1922 to 1923. He was born in Birmingham, England and moved to Vancouver in April 1888. In 1899 he was elected Chairman of the Vancouver Board of Trade.

In 1907, Tisdall married Edith B. White.

He was a member of the province's legislative assembly with the British Columbia Conservative Party. Tisdall represented Vancouver City in the assembly from 1898 to 1900 and from 1909 to 1916. He was named Minister of Public Works in the provincial cabinet; in the resulting by-election held in March 1916, Tisdall was defeated by Malcolm Archibald Macdonald. He ran unsuccessfully for reelection in the general election held in September 1916.

He became mayor under a new "proportional representation" voting the city introduced in 1921.  Tisdal was re-elected in the December 1922 election. Four rounds of voting were required before the winner was determined. In a plebiscite held June 1923, Vancouver voters voted to abandon STV. And the 1924 election was held using the FPTP system.

Tisdall served as a Vancouver alderman and died while serving in that capacity. He was also serving for the city's parks board.

Kevin Michael Tisdall son of John Andrew Tisdall from Dublin Ireland is of the same lineage

References

External links
Vancouver History: list of mayors, accessed 20 August 2006

1866 births
1936 deaths
British Columbia Conservative Party politicians
British Columbia Conservative Party MLAs
English emigrants to Canada
Mayors of Vancouver
People from Birmingham, West Midlands
Burials at Mountain View Cemetery (Vancouver)
20th-century Canadian politicians